Aestuariibaculum suncheonense  is a Gram-negative, strictly aerobic, halotolerant and non-motil bacterium from the genus of Aestuariibaculum which has been isolated from tidal flat from the Suncheon bay in Korea.

References

External links
Type strain of Aestuariibaculum suncheonense at BacDive -  the Bacterial Diversity Metadatabase

Flavobacteria
Bacteria described in 2013